Sant'Ambrogio is the Roman Catholic mother church or chiesa matrice in the center of the town of Cerami, in the province of Enna, region of Sicily, Italy.

History and Description
A church at this site, dedicated to St Ambrose, was likely implanted by the Norman conquerors of the 12th-century. A larger church was initially built in 1455 and refurbished in the following centuries. It houses a white marble Madonna and Child by Antonello Gagini. It also has an 18th-century statues of St Michael Archangel by Filippo Quattrocchi of Gangi.

References

15th-century Roman Catholic church buildings in Italy
Churches in the province of Enna